Events from the year 1871 in Scotland.

Incumbents

Law officers 
 Lord Advocate – George Young
 Solicitor General for Scotland – Andrew Rutherfurd-Clark

Judiciary 
 Lord President of the Court of Session and Lord Justice General – Lord Glencorse
 Lord Justice Clerk – Lord Moncreiff

Events 
 7 March – the first rugby international, played in Edinburgh, results in a 4–1 win by Scotland over England.
 26 May – Parliament passes the Bank Holidays Act which creates five annual bank holidays in Scotland.
 1 August – the Arlington Swimming Club, designed by John Burnet, opens in the district of Charing Cross, Glasgow.
 6 November – the Edinburgh Street Tramways Company begins operating horsecars, the first tram system in Scotland.
 10 November – missing Scottish explorer and missionary Dr. David Livingstone is located by journalist Henry Morton Stanley in Ujiji, near Lake Tanganyika.
 Patent Asbestos Manufacturing Co. established in Glasgow, perhaps the first such plant in the U.K.
 Thomas Lipton opens his first grocery shop, in Glasgow.

Births 
 21 January – Ernest Kitto, cricketer in New Zealand (died 1897 at sea)
 27 January – Samuel Peploe, painter (died 1935)
 17 February
John A. Gilruth, veterinary surgeon and colonial administrator (died 1937 in Australia)
Peter Corsar Anderson, golfer (died 1955)
 10 September – Thomas Adams, urban planner (died 1940)
 12 September – John Campbell, international footballer (died 1947)
 Lachlan Grant, physician (died 1945)
 Thomas W. Lamb, theatre architect in the United States (died 1942)

Deaths 
 5 February – James Munro, soldier, recipient of the Victoria Cross (born 1826)
 17 March – Robert Chambers, publisher and geologist (born 1802)
 20 April – Samuel Halkett, librarian (born 1814)
 6 September – James Burns, shipowner (born 1789)
 22 October – Roderick Murchison, geologist (born 1792)

The arts
 William Alexander's realist novel Johnny Gibb of Gushetneuk is published in book form (having been serialised in the Aberdeen Free Press 1869-70).
 William Black's novel A Daughter of Heth is published.

See also 
 Timeline of Scottish history
 1871 in the United Kingdom

References 

 
Years of the 19th century in Scotland
Scotland
1870s in Scotland